Mohammad Parvin Gonabadi was an Iranian literary scholar and politician.

Early life and education
Parvin Gonabadi was born in Gonabad into a clerical family. He went to Mashhad to study and became a teacher, holding literacy courses for workers and contributing to formation of a teacher's trade union.

Professional career
Parvin Gonabadi edited a newspaper in Mashhad, where he also served as the headmaster of the city's main state school for girls. He published his poems and later helped Ali-Akbar Dehkhoda to write the landmark
Loghatnameh.

Political career 
He joined the Democrat Party's chapter in Mashhad, and the Socialist Party during the 1920s. Due to his political activities, he was briefly imprisoned in 1926 and 1929.

In the first congress of Tudeh Party held in 1944, he was elected as a member of the central committee, though he was considered a "newcomer". In the elections for the 14th term of Iranian parliament, he took eat as the deputy for Sabzevar. He was excluded from the party's central committee in 1946, because he was not a "not [a] full-fledged Marxist".

References

Iranian translators
Central Committee of the Tudeh Party of Iran members
Tudeh Party of Iran MPs
Democrat Party of Iran politicians
Socialist Party (Iran) politicians
Members of the 14th Iranian Majlis
20th-century Iranian poets
People from Sabzevar
20th-century Iranian educators
Iranian trade unionists
Year of birth missing
Year of death missing